Client 9: The Rise and Fall of Eliot Spitzer is a documentary directed by Alex Gibney about former New York Governor Eliot Spitzer and the sex scandal that derailed his political career. It premiered at the 2010 Tribeca Film Festival on April 24, 2010; on iTunes and Magnolia On Demand on October 1, 2010; and in movie theaters in limited release on November 5, 2010.

Gibney made the film with on-camera cooperation from Spitzer.  The director also shared ideas and information with writer Peter Elkind, who wrote the book “Rough Justice: The Rise and Fall of Eliot Spitzer".

Contributors
 "Angelina" – Escort, Co-Worker of Ashley Dupré at Emperors Club VIP (portrayed by Wrenn Schmidt)
 Mike Balboni – Deputy Secretary for Public Safety to Governor Spitzer
 Wayne Barrett – Senior Editor, The Village Voice
 Richard Beattie – Legal Counsel to the Independent Directors of AIG
 Zana Brazdek– Formerly of Emperors Club VIP
 Joe Bruno – NY Senate Majority Leader, 1994-2008
 David Brown – Former Staff Lawyer to Attorney General Spitzer
 Lloyd Constantine – Former Spitzer Advisor
 Fred Dicker – New York Post State Editor
 Darren Dopp – Communications Director to Attorney General Spitzer
 Peter Elkind – Author of Rough Justice: The Rise and Fall of Eliot Spitzer
 Karen Finley – Performance Artist
 Robert Graham – Former Gen Re Counsel
 Maurice “Hank” Greenberg – Former Chairman and CEO of AIG
 Noreen Harrington – Former Executive, Stern Asset Management
 Scott Horton – Professor, Columbia Law School
 John Houldsworth – Former CEO of Gen Re Subsidiary
 Ken Langone – chairman and CEO of Invemed Associates
 Elizabet Monrad – Former CFO of Gen Re
 "Natalia" – Former Escort
 Jimmy Siegel – Media Consultant
 Kristian Stiles – National Finance Director to Eliot Spitzer
 Roger Stone – Political Consultant
 Cecil Suwal – Former CEO of Emperors Club VIP
 Hulbert Waldroup – Painter
 John Whitehead – Former Chairman Goldman Sachs

Reception
On review aggregator website Rotten Tomatoes, the film holds an approval rating of 91% based on 69 reviews, and an average rating of 7.3/10. On Metacritic, the film has a weighted average score of 68 out of 100, based on 24 critics, indicating "generally favorable reviews".

References

External links
 
 
 

2010 films
American documentary films
Eliot Spitzer
Films directed by Alex Gibney
Documentary films about American politicians
2010 documentary films
2010s English-language films
2010s American films